Bell City High School is a public K-12 school located in Bell City, Louisiana, United States and is a part of the Calcasieu Parish School Board.

The school mascot is the Bruins.

Facts and figures

School organizations 
4-H Club
Chess Club
Future Business Leaders of America
Fellowship of Christian Athletes
Future Farmers of America
French Club
Literary Rally
Quiz Bowl
Student Council
Beta Club
Yearbook

Athletics
Bell City High athletics competes in the LHSAA.

Sports sponsored:
Baseball
Boys/Girls Basketball
Boys/Girls Cross Country
Boys Golf
Boys/Girls Rodeo
Softball
Boys/Girls Track & Field

References

External links 
 
 www.cpsb.org
 www.publicschoolreview.com

Public high schools in Louisiana
Schools in Calcasieu Parish, Louisiana
Public middle schools in Louisiana
Public elementary schools in Louisiana